The Railway Station Bananal building is located in the historical and tourist city of Bananal in São Paulo State, Brazil. Built in 1888, it is the only specimen of steel construction in the Americas that was imported from Belgium.

References

Transport in São Paulo (state)
Railway stations opened in 1888
Railway stations in Brazil
1888 establishments in Brazil